Dark Is the Night is a 1945 Soviet war film directed by Boris Barnet.

Plot
The film is set during the Great Patriotic War. At night a burning plane crashes on the ruins of an occupied city. The surviving Soviet pilots, among whom are some who are seriously injured, hide from the Nazi persecution. To help them comes a very young Varya, who hides them in her attic. Having lost her mother and sister, she works as a cleaner in the German headquarters. Unbeknownst to the watchmen, she provides the pilots with food and medicine. She is happy about the fact that now there is someone to talk to and someone to help. But the Nazis manage to find out Varya's secret. Having had time to warn the pilots, Varya sacrifices her life in order to save them.

Cast 
 Irina Radchenko - Varya
 Boris Andreyev as pilot Khristoforov
 Ivan Kuznetsov as Vyatkin, pilot / Artankin
 Aleksei Yudin as Belugin, school principal / Feldwebel
 V. Leonov as Veselovskiy, grandfather
 B. Vyazemskiy as Dr. Orlov
 Olga Goreva as elderly woman Ulyana
 Nikolai Dupak as pilot Sannikov
 Boris Barnet as German commander Colonel Belts

References

External links 

1940s war drama films
Soviet war drama films
Films directed by Boris Barnet
Armenfilm films
Soviet black-and-white films
1945 drama films
1945 films
1940s Russian-language films